Robertson is a railway station in Robertson, New South Wales, on the Unanderra–Moss Vale railway line. The station opened in 1932 to connect the producers of south-western New South Wales with the new wharves at Port Kembla, with the single-track line featuring a passing loop near the village of Robertson. A station was built to serve the village, with trains running between the Southern Highlands and Wollongong. Passenger services were operated by the State Rail Authority and its predecessors until the route was replaced by coaches in 1991. The station building is of state heritage significance and is now cared for by the Robertson Heritage Railway Station Committee. Occasional tourist trains operated by 3801 Limited, such as the Cockatoo Run, call at the station.

The station is located on the main line. There is a still-operational passing loop opposite; a perway siding is located to the west.

Image gallery

References

External links 
Robertson Heritage Railway Station

Regional railway stations in New South Wales
Railway stations in Australia opened in 1932